This is a list of Scottish football transfers for the 2010–11 season.

Only moves featuring at least one 2010–11 Scottish Premier League club or one 2010–11 Scottish First Division club are listed.

May 2010 - December 2010

January 2011 - May 2011

References

 

Transfers
Scottish
Scottish
2010